James "Jim" A. Sharpe, FRHS (born Oct. 9, 1946), is professor emeritus of early modern history at the University of York. He is a specialist in witchcraft, and crime and punishment, in early modern England.

Sharpe earned his BA and DPhil at the University of Oxford and joined the University of York as a lecturer in 1973. He became professor in 1997 and retired in 2016.

Selected publications
 Crime in Seventeenth-Century England. Cambridge University Press/Past and Present Publications, 1983.
 "William Holcroft his Booke": Office Holding in Late Stuart Essex. Essex Record Office, Essex Historical Documents, 2, 1986.
 Crime and the Law in English Satirical Prints 1600 - 1832. Chadwyck - Healey, 1986.
 Judicial Punishment in England. Faber and Faber, 1990.
 Early Modern England: a Social History 1550 - 1760. Edward Arnold, 1987: 2nd edn., 1997.
 Instruments of Darkness: Witchcraft in England 1550 - 1750. Hamish Hamilton, 1996.
 Crime in Early Modern England 1550 - 1750. Longman, 1984: 2nd edn., 1998.
 The Bewitching of Anne Gunter: A horrible and true story of deception, witchcraft, murder and the King of England. Profile Books, 2000.
 Dick Turpin: The Myth of the English Highwayman. Profile Books, 2004.
 A Fiery & Furious People. Random House, 2016.

References 

1946 births
Living people
Academics of the University of York
Alumni of the University of Oxford
Fellows of the Royal Historical Society
Historians of England
Historians of witchcraft